The Komi-Permyak constituency (No.216) was a Russian legislative constituency in the Komi-Permyak Autonomous Okrug in 1993–2007. In 2005 Komi-Permyak AO was merged with Perm Oblast, so currently the territory of former Komi-Permyak constituency is now a part of Kudymkar constituency of Perm Krai.

Members elected

Election results

1993

|-
! colspan=2 style="background-color:#E9E9E9;text-align:left;vertical-align:top;" |Candidate
! style="background-color:#E9E9E9;text-align:left;vertical-align:top;" |Party
! style="background-color:#E9E9E9;text-align:right;" |Votes
! style="background-color:#E9E9E9;text-align:right;" |%
|-
|style="background-color:"|
|align=left|Anna Vlasova
|align=left|Independent
|
|19.43%
|-
|style="background-color:"|
|align=left|Vladimir Shipitsyn
|align=left|Independent
| -
|13.50%
|-
| colspan="5" style="background-color:#E9E9E9;"|
|- style="font-weight:bold"
| colspan="3" style="text-align:left;" | Total
| 
| 100%
|-
| colspan="5" style="background-color:#E9E9E9;"|
|- style="font-weight:bold"
| colspan="4" |Source:
|
|}

1995

|-
! colspan=2 style="background-color:#E9E9E9;text-align:left;vertical-align:top;" |Candidate
! style="background-color:#E9E9E9;text-align:left;vertical-align:top;" |Party
! style="background-color:#E9E9E9;text-align:right;" |Votes
! style="background-color:#E9E9E9;text-align:right;" |%
|-
|style="background-color:"|
|align=left|Anna Vlasova (incumbent)
|align=left|Independent
|
|21.15%
|-
|style="background-color:"|
|align=left|Gennady Savelyev
|align=left|Independent
|
|18.35%
|-
|style="background-color:"|
|align=left|Vasily Zhizhilev
|align=left|Independent
|
|11.64%
|-
|style="background-color:"|
|align=left|Valery Vankov
|align=left|Independent
|
|9.38%
|-
|style="background-color:"|
|align=left|Mikhail Vodyanov
|align=left|Independent
|
|7.43%
|-
|style="background-color:"|
|align=left|Vladimir Shipitsyn
|align=left|Independent
|
|6.11%
|-
|style="background-color:"|
|align=left|Aleksandr Popov
|align=left|Liberal Democratic Party
|
|3.83%
|-
|style="background-color:"|
|align=left|Sergey Systerov
|align=left|Independent
|
|2.82%
|-
|style="background-color:"|
|align=left|Nikolay Troshev
|align=left|Independent
|
|2.74%
|-
|style="background-color:"|
|align=left|Vladimir Yarusov
|align=left|Independent
|
|1.97%
|-
|style="background-color:#019CDC"|
|align=left|Andrey Yablokov
|align=left|Party of Russian Unity and Accord
|
|1.26%
|-
|style="background-color:#000000"|
|colspan=2 |against all
|
|11.32%
|-
| colspan="5" style="background-color:#E9E9E9;"|
|- style="font-weight:bold"
| colspan="3" style="text-align:left;" | Total
| 
| 100%
|-
| colspan="5" style="background-color:#E9E9E9;"|
|- style="font-weight:bold"
| colspan="4" |Source:
|
|}

1999

|-
! colspan=2 style="background-color:#E9E9E9;text-align:left;vertical-align:top;" |Candidate
! style="background-color:#E9E9E9;text-align:left;vertical-align:top;" |Party
! style="background-color:#E9E9E9;text-align:right;" |Votes
! style="background-color:#E9E9E9;text-align:right;" |%
|-
|style="background-color:"|
|align=left|Andrey Klimov
|align=left|Independent
|
|60.21%
|-
|style="background-color:"|
|align=left|Vitaly Kozlovsky
|align=left|Independent
|
|8.93%
|-
|style="background-color:#020266"|
|align=left|Anna Vlasova (incumbent)
|align=left|Russian Socialist Party
|
|6.83%
|-
|style="background-color:"|
|align=left|Vasily Khrulev
|align=left|Independent
|
|4.50%
|-
|style="background-color:"|
|align=left|Leonid Rassada
|align=left|Independent
|
|2.69%
|-
|style="background-color:"|
|align=left|Marina Tyusheva
|align=left|Independent
|
|1.67%
|-
|style="background-color:"|
|align=left|Mikhail Pyankov
|align=left|Independent
|
|1.46%
|-
|style="background-color:"|
|align=left|Aleksandr Chetin
|align=left|Independent
|
|1.34%
|-
|style="background-color:#FCCA19"|
|align=left|Vasily Myasnikov
|align=left|Congress of Russian Communities-Yury Boldyrev Movement
|
|1.32%
|-
|style="background-color:"|
|align=left|Ivan Storozhev
|align=left|Independent
|
|1.26%
|-
|style="background-color:#084284"|
|align=left|Vladimir Ivanov
|align=left|Spiritual Heritage
|
|0.96%
|-
|style="background-color:"|
|align=left|Andrey Gavrilov
|align=left|Independent
|
|0.44%
|-
|style="background-color:#000000"|
|colspan=2 |against all
|
|6.16%
|-
| colspan="5" style="background-color:#E9E9E9;"|
|- style="font-weight:bold"
| colspan="3" style="text-align:left;" | Total
| 
| 100%
|-
| colspan="5" style="background-color:#E9E9E9;"|
|- style="font-weight:bold"
| colspan="4" |Source:
|
|}

2003

|-
! colspan=2 style="background-color:#E9E9E9;text-align:left;vertical-align:top;" |Candidate
! style="background-color:#E9E9E9;text-align:left;vertical-align:top;" |Party
! style="background-color:#E9E9E9;text-align:right;" |Votes
! style="background-color:#E9E9E9;text-align:right;" |%
|-
|style="background-color:"|
|align=left|Andrey Klimov (incumbent)
|align=left|Independent
|
|62.74%
|-
|style="background-color:"|
|align=left|Anatoly Nikitasenko
|align=left|Independent
|
|10.38%
|-
|style="background-color:"|
|align=left|Mikhail Kodanyov
|align=left|Independent
|
|7.82%
|-
|style="background-color:"|
|align=left|Yury Bykov
|align=left|Communist Party
|
|7.35%
|-
|style="background-color:#7C73CC"|
|align=left|Aleksandr Anisimov
|align=left|Great Russia–Eurasian Union
|
|1.28%
|-
|style="background-color:"|
|align=left|Aleksandr Chatin
|align=left|Independent
|
|0.85%
|-
|style="background-color:"|
|align=left|Oleg Sedykh
|align=left|Independent
|
|0.32%
|-
|style="background-color:#000000"|
|colspan=2 |against all
|
|7.51%
|-
| colspan="5" style="background-color:#E9E9E9;"|
|- style="font-weight:bold"
| colspan="3" style="text-align:left;" | Total
| 
| 100%
|-
| colspan="5" style="background-color:#E9E9E9;"|
|- style="font-weight:bold"
| colspan="4" |Source:
|
|}

References

Obsolete Russian legislative constituencies
Politics of the Komi-Permyak Autonomous Okrug